Megachile ingenua is a species of leafcutter bee in the family Megachilidae. It was described by Cresson in 1878. Not seen since the 1960s, it is thought to be possibly extinct

References

Ingenua
Insects described in 1878